Blue 'n' Boogie is a 1944 jazz standard. It was written by Dizzy Gillespie and Frank Paparelli. It can be found on Gillespie's 1955 compilation album Groovin' High, and was notably performed by trumpeter Miles Davis on Miles Davis All-Star Sextet (1954; later released as the first side of Walkin'), guitarist Wes Montgomery on Full House (1962), and Sonny Rollins on Now's the Time (1964).

See also
List of jazz standards

References

1940s jazz standards
1944 songs
Bebop jazz standards
Compositions by Dizzy Gillespie